The Honda C92  Benly is a  parallel-twin motorcycle made by Honda from 1959 through 1965.  Running concurrently were the CB92 Sports and the slightly larger C95 , called the CA92 and CA95 in the US. These twins took their styling and design cues from the larger-displacement Honda C71, C76, C72, C77 Dream series.

Description
The name Benly comes from the Japanese word benri, meaning convenient.

The frame was a pressed-steel, fully-welded design with the front end carrying the steering head and the rear end forming the deeply valanced mudguard. The front forks were pressed steel and carried the front mudguard. Front suspension was of the leading link type. Rear suspension was by fully enclosed telescopic dampers. Front and rear brakes were six-inch single-leading-shoe type in full-width hubs. Wheels were 16-inch.

The engine was a straight- or parallel-twin, four stroke with two valves per cylinder operated by a chain-driven overhead camshaft. The compression ratio of the C92 was 8.3:1, and the C95's was 9.7:1. Honda's claimed horsepower for the C92 was  @ 9,500 rpm and  @ 10,000 rpm for the C95. The claimed torque was  @ 8,200 rpm for the C92 and  @ 9,000 rpm for the C95. They had a  fuel tanks, and single 18 mm (C92) or 20 mm (C95) carburettors. The primary drive was by helical-cut gears to a multi-plate clutch running in oil which lubricated both the engine and the four-speed gearbox, and a fully enclosed chain final drive. The electrical system was six volts and an electric starter was a standard fitment on all models.

C92 and C95

Cosmetically, the C92 and C95 (called CA92 and CA95 in the US) differed mainly in their handlebars. The European bikes had flat pressed steel bars and the American bikes had raised tubular bars but when the C95 was brought to Europe, it was equipped with the raised tubular bars. There was also a CS92 which had a high-level scrambler style exhaust system.

Cosmetically, it had briefer mudguards and small chain-guard. The fuel tank was larger, holding 10.5 litres (2.3 imp gal). The rear suspension had exposed springs. Both brakes were 8 inch with the front being a twin-leading-shoe type. Both wheels were 18 inch. The engine had higher compression pistons of 10:1. Quoted HP/rpm was 15/10,500 and torque in kg.m/rpm was 1.06/9,000. The crankshaft of the CB92 was supported by three main bearings instead of two in the standard engine.

See also
List of motorcycles of the 1950s

References

C95
Standard motorcycles
Motorcycles powered by straight-twin engines
Motorcycles introduced in 1959